Mitopunta (possibly from Quechua mit'u, mitu mud, punta peak; ridge; first, before, in front of) is a  mountain in the Huayhuash mountain range in the Andes of Peru. It is located in the Lima Region, Cajatambo Province, Cajatambo District. Mitopunta lies on a sub-range west of the main range east of Huacshash. It is situated north of the Pumarinri valley.

References

Mountains of Peru
Mountains of Lima Region